The British Isles have few endemic species due to past frequent glaciations and because of the proximity to Continental Europe and former land bridges which enabled species to re-colonise the islands from the continent following glaciations. Most endemic species to the British Isles are considered to be subspecies of a larger species, with mutations or adaptations slightly changing the species in the islands or in certain localities.

British conservationists often describe this as a "wiped clean effect" with repeated glaciations forcing many species out of the modern area of the islands to more southern latitudes in Europe and perhaps even driving some species extinct.

Some species which were present in Britain before past glaciations, often during periods with a warmer climate than now failed to return after the Last Glacial Maximum. Amongst these are Rhododendron ponticum and rabbits, now considered invasive and non-native.

A species is only deemed native if it reached the British Isles without human intervention (either intentional or unintentional). That means that to be native the species must have reached Britain before the land bridge joining Britain to the continent was submerged. Alternatively species can also be native when they have flown or swum to Britain as is the case with many bird species which arrived after the submersion of the land bridge, a recent example is the collared dove which arrived in the 1950s, this also applies for plants which spread seed in the wind.

A few endemic species are Arctic-Alpine species, survivors of Arctic species of plants and animals which either adapted to the warming climate or became isolated in suitable areas of mountains or lakes which still retained a suitable micro-climate. A common misconception is that the entirety of the British Isles was under glaciers and was uninhabitable both for humans, plants and animals. Whilst unsuitable for most species, a number of Arctic species survived in the areas not under glaciers in southern areas of England, Wales and south west Ireland and were either driven to extinction in the British Isles or to micro-climatic refuges as the climate warmed and the Arctic conditions retreated north.

Most endemic species or subspecies however date to more recent, post-glacial times, many having spread via land bridges or along the Atlantic seaboard of Europe.

Origins of endemic species
Ice Age survivors in suitable micro-climates
Subspecies (offshoots) of a larger species, many may in turn develop into new species
Glacial or pre-glacial survivors which have become extinct across much of their former range or have never occurred outside of Britain.

Fungi
 Geastrum britannicum – An earthstar fungus, first seen in Norfolk by Jonathan Revett, and confirmed as a distinct species in 2015. It has so far (2015) been found in at least fifteen locations in England and Wales.

Bryophytes
 Cornish path-moss (Ditrichum cornubicum) – endemic to Cornwall (a recent discovery in West Cork is probably an accidental introduction)
Derbyshire feathermoss (Thamnobryum angustifolium) – endemic to a single site in the Derbyshire Peak District.
 Dixon's thread moss – Scotland only.
 Scottish thread moss – Scotland only.
 Scottish beard moss – Scotland only.

Vascular plants

In 1999, 47 species of flowering plants (430 including microspecies) were considered to be endemic to the British Isles, 32 of them in the "critical genera" Euphrasia, Limonium and Sorbus. Further additions are made from time to time, as cited below.

Alchemilla minima
Athyrium flexile
Bromus interruptus
Calamagrostis scotica
Cerastium nigrescens
Cochlearia atlantica
Cochlearia micacea
Coincya wrightii
Cotoneaster cambricus
Epipactis youngiana
Erythranthe peregrina
Euphrasia anglica
Euphrasia cambrica
Euphrasia campbelliae
Euphrasia heslop-harrisonii
Euphrasia marshallii
Euphrasia pseudokerneri
Euphrasia rivularis
Euphrasia rotundifolia
Euphrasia vigursii
Fumaria occidentalis
Fumaria purpurea
Gentianella anglica
Hieracium attenboroughianum
Limonium britannicum
Limonium dodartiforme
Limonium loganicum
Limonium paradoxum
Limonium parvum
Limonium procerum
Limonium recurvum
Limonium transwallianum
Primula scotica
Senecio cambrensis
Sorbus anglica
Sorbus arranensis
Sorbus bristoliensis
Sorbus devoniensis
Sorbus eminens
Sorbus hibernica
Sorbus lancastriensis
Sorbus leptophylla
Sorbus leyana
Sorbus minima
Sorbus porrigentiformis
Sorbus pseudofennica
Sorbus pseudomeinichii
Sorbus subcuneata
Sorbus vexans
Sorbus wilmottiana
Ulmus plotii

Subsequently, Hieracium attenboroughianum is an endemic plant which was discovered in the Brecon Beacons in 2004 and Sorbus pseudomeinichii was discovered on the island of Arran in 2007. In 2015, a newly formed and endemic species of monkeyflower (Erythranthe peregrina) was identified in Scotland and the Scottish islands. Bromus interruptus is an endemic to England, which was extinct in the wild but has been reintroduced from saved seed. The total number of endemic plant species has now grown to 52.

Spiders
 Nothophantes horridus Merrett & Stevens, 1995 – the ground-weaver spider is found at four sites in Plymouth, Devon.

Amphipoda (freshwater)
Niphargus glennei (Spooner) – the south-western ground water shrimp is found in Cornwall and Devon.

Insects

 Eudarcia richardsoni (Walsingham, 1900) – a micromoth only found on the Dorset coast.
 Piesma quadratum spergulariae a Heteroptera bug – Isles of Scilly.
 Bombus muscorum scyllonius (Richards) Scilly bee – a bumble bee, which in the 1960s was found on all the inhabited islands of the Isles of Scilly with the exception of Bryher, and currently is only known from St Agnes, Great Ganilly and Great Arthur.
 Psylliodes luridipennis, the Lundy cabbage flea beetle, is known only from the island of Lundy, where it feeds upon the Lundy cabbage.
 Ceutorhynchus contractus var. pallipes, a weevil that, like the Lundy cabbage flea beetle, is known only from the island of Lundy, where it feeds upon the Lundy cabbage.
 Papilio machaon britannicus
 Erebia epiphron mnemon

Isopods

Metatrichoniscoides celticus Oliver & Trew, 1981 - A small woodlouse usually below 3mm. It is found only on maritime cliffs in the Vale of Glamorgan from Ogmore-by-Sea to St. Donat's.

Birds

Britain has few endemic species of birds but quite a few subspecies. A few Arctic-Alpine species have subspecies in the British Isles, some have been in the islands since the last Ice Age, but many spread in the immediate Sub-Arctic conditions as the ice retreated.
Furthermore, these species were later reinforced by newer arrivals as the climate assumed temperatures and conditions more similar to the present day.

Red grouse – classified either as a distinct species or a subspecies of willow grouse – doesn't change plumage in winter as willow grouse does – Upland and Moorland areas of Great Britain and Ireland.
Pied wagtail – British subspecies of the pied / white wagtail–throughout British Isles.
Shetland wren – Shetland Islands, Scotland only.
Fair Isle wren – Fair Isle, Scotland only.
St Kilda wren – St Kilda Islands, Scotland only.
Scottish crossbill – Highlands, Scotland only.
British Isles subspecies of white-throated dipper

Mammals

Britain has a few subspecies of mammals but no endemic species. Many again are Ice Age survivors that adapted to the new conditions; others arrived in warmer conditions whilst the land bridge still existed.

Irish hare or the Irish subspecies of the mountain hare – Mountain hares are also found in other locations of the British Isles, but in Ireland have the distinction of not turning white in winter.
Scottish red deer
Scottish wildcat – Formerly also found in Northern England and Wales, this subspecies of the European wildcat is now restricted to a few locations in Scotland largely due to hunting and hybridisation with domestic cats.
St Kilda field mouse – St Kilda Islands only. A subspecies of the wood mouse.
Orkney vole – Orkney only. A subspecies of the common vole.
Skomer vole - Skomer Island only. A subspecies of the bank vole.
Canna mouse - Canna, Scotland only. A subspecies of the house mouse.

Aquatic fauna

Cnidaria
The Cnidaria are a group of animals found exclusively in aquatic and mostly marine environments. They include sea anemones, sea pen and corals and their distinguishing feature is cnidocytes, specialized cells that they use mainly for capturing prey.

 Ivell's sea anemone (Edwardsia ivelli) described in 1975 and found in Widewater Lagoon in West Sussex.

Fish
In some areas of uplands in the British Isles the retreating glaciers left melt water in hollows which had been carved out by the movement of ice. In these, Arctic species of fish survived, due often to the sheer depth of the lakes and the colder temperatures. For the young endemic fish varieties of the British Isles, it is usually controversial whether they should be considered as distinct taxa (species or subspecies) or just as isolated populations of their ancestral species.

As global warming affects the British climate there is some concern for these species, some confined to a handful of lakes. Action has been taken to protect them, as is the case with vendace which has been moved to tarns in nearby mountains due to the cooler temperatures. It is hoped that these will act as refuges should the species die-out in the lower-level lakes where they occur naturally.
Killarney shad (Alosa killarnensis)  – Ireland only.
Gwyniad (Coregonus pennantii) – Snowdonia only.
Schelly (Coregonus stigmaticus) – Lake District only.
Vendace (Coregonus vandesius) – Lake District and Dumfries and Galloway only.
Pollan (Coregonus pollan) – Ireland only.
Powan (Coregonus clupeoides) – Scotland only.
Ferox trout (Salmo ferox) – Ireland, Scotland, Cumbria and Wales only, validity questionable (possibly a brown trout variant)
Gillaroo (Salmo stomachicus) – Ireland only
Sonaghan (Salmo nigripinnis) – Ireland only
Haddy charr (Salvelinus killinensis) – Scotland only
Salvelinus colii  – Republic of Ireland only
Salvelinus fimbriatus – Republic of Ireland only
Salvelinus gracillimus – Shetland Islands and perhaps Scotland
Melvin charr (Salvelinus grayi) – Ireland only
Orkney charr (Salvelinus inframundus) – Orkney Islands (where extirpated) and Scotland only
Salvelinus lonsdalii – Cumbria only
Salvelinus mallochi – Scotland only
Salvelinus maxillaris – Scotland only
Salvelinus obtusus – Republic of Ireland only
Salvelinus perisii – Wales only
Salvelinus struanensis – Scotland only
Golden charr (Salvelinus youngeri) – Scotland only
Salvelinus willughbii – Cumbria only

Extinct

Presumed British subspecies of the grey wolf (Canis lupus)
Essex emerald moth (Thetidia smaragdaria maritima, a British subspecies)
St Kilda house mouse (Mus musculus muralis, subspecies of the house mouse from St. Kilda)
Large copper butterfly (Lycaena dispar dispar)
Presumed British strain of the subspecies of the Old British/Irish black bee (Apis mellifera mellifera)
Hieracium cambricogothicum

Distribution

The distribution of endemic species seems to have a north western bias and with endemic species on the whole showing an oceanic / alpine distribution with most endemics being found in upland areas or islands.

Endemic livestock breeds

Human bred-animals are not usually classified as distinct subspecies but rather breeds which is a similar concept. However some animals such as Iron Age pigs are classified as a distinct species from their wild relatives.

See also
List of extinct animals of the British Isles – many species listed became extinct due to the retreat of Arctic conditions after the last Ice Age or due to man, many now surviving in the Arctic.
List of extinct plants of the British Isles
Insular dwarfism
Insular gigantism
Fauna of Great Britain
Fauna of Ireland
Flora of Great Britain

References

Ecology of the British Isles
Endemic
British Isles
british